is a 1999 Japan film directed by Akihiko Shiota and based on the manga Gekko no sasayaki by Masahiko Kikuni.

Plot
A boy (Takuya) meets a girl (Satsuki), both 17 years of age, and they fall in love. When she discovers his fetishes Satsuki brands Takuya hentai (pervert) and leaves him, only to be drawn back by the power his fetishes give her over him.

She has him watch as she had sex with another man, then asks him to lick her body.

Cast
 Kenji Mizuhashi as Takuya Hidaka
 Tsugumi as Satsuki Kitahara
 Kōta Kusano as Tadashi Uematsu
 Harumi Inoue as Shizuka Kitahara
 Yoshiki Sekino as Maruken

Reception
The film has received mixed reviews, scoring 57 out of 100 on the review aggregator site Metacritic.

Awards
 1999: Special Jury Prize at the 10th Yubari International Fantastic Film Festival
 1999: Directors Guild of Japan New Directors Award
 1999: Hochi Film Award (Best New Director for Akihiko Shiota)
 1999: Locarno International Film Festival, Golden Leopard (Nomination for Akihiko Shiota)
 2000: Japanese Professional Movie Award
 Tsugumi (Best New Actress)
 Akihiko Shiota (Best New Director)
 2000: Mainichi Film Concours, Sponichi Grand Prize (New Talent Award for Akihiko Shiota)
 Yokohama Film Festival, Festival Prize
 Best New Director Akihiko Shiota
 Best New Talent Tsugumi

See also 
 Sadism and masochism in fiction

References

External links 
 
 
 

Live-action films based on manga
Films directed by Akihiko Shiota
1999 films
BDSM in films
1990s Japanese-language films
Nikkatsu films
1990s Japanese films